Adrian White (born 21 April 1933) is a New Zealand equestrian. He competed at the 1960 Summer Olympics and the 1964 Summer Olympics. In March 2020, the entire 1964 Olympic equestrian team of four riders (including Charlie Matthews, who as reserve did not get to compete) was inducted into the Equestrian Sports New Zealand Hall of Fame.

References

1933 births
Living people
New Zealand male equestrians
Olympic equestrians of New Zealand
Equestrians at the 1960 Summer Olympics
Equestrians at the 1964 Summer Olympics
Sportspeople from Napier, New Zealand